10/31 is a 2017 American anthology horror film consisting of five Halloween-themed short stories directed by Justin M. Seaman, Zane Hershberger, John William Holt, Brett DeJager, and Rocky Gray, along with a wraparound story directed by Hunter Johnson. The film is executive produced by P. J. Starks.

10/31 premiered at the Death By Festival in Austin, Texas, on October 28, 2017.

Reception
Matt Boiselle of Dread Central called the film "fun, spooky and damn entertaining", writing that "I can't recommend 10/31 enough for those who love their horror in short bursts, and all under one roof – make sure this is on your viewing list, for if these directors are the future of the genre, then we're in good bloody hands."

Home media
10/31 was released on DVD, Blu-ray, and VHS in 2018 by Scream Team Releasing.

References

External links
 

2017 films
2017 horror films
American horror anthology films
Halloween horror films
2010s English-language films
2010s American films